The hearty elimia, Elimia jonesi,  is an extinct species of freshwater snails with an operculum in the family Pleuroceridae. This species was endemic to the United States. It is now extinct.

References 

Elimia
Extinct gastropods
Gastropods described in 1936
Taxa named by Edwin Stephen Goodrich
Taxonomy articles created by Polbot